WUTZ (88.3 FM) was a radio station licensed to Summertown, Tennessee, United States. The station was owned by Radio Free Broadcasting Company. The station's license was cancelled on April 14, 2020.

References

External links
 

UTZ
Lawrence County, Tennessee
Defunct radio stations in the United States
Radio stations disestablished in 2020
2020 disestablishments in Tennessee
UTZ
Radio stations established in 1979
1979 establishments in Tennessee